Dhrangadhra Railway was a  metre gauge in the Dhrangadhra state in Gujarat during the 19th century.

History
Dhrangadhra Railway was owned by Ghanshyamsinhji of Dhrangadhra state, who ruled from 1889 to 1942. It was opened to traffic in 1898. A small metre gauge section between Dhrangadhra and Wadhwan was opened in 1905. Initially it worked with Bhavnagar–Gondal–Junagad–Porbandar Railway until 1911. Later it worked with Bhavnagar State Railway until 1942. During this time the total rail line was 40 miles.

Conversion to broad gauge 
The railway lines were converted to  broad gauge in 1984.

References

Metre gauge railways in India
Defunct railway companies of India
History of rail transport in Gujarat